The SAFE Banking Act, officially H.R. 1595, full title Secure and Fair Enforcement (SAFE) Act, and also referred to as the SAFE Banking Act of 2019, was proposed legislation regarding disposition of funds gained through the cannabis industry in the United States.

History 
On March 7, 2019, the bill was introduced in U.S. House of Representatives by Ed Perlmutter (D-CO) and was referred to the Judiciary and Financial Services Committees. On March 28, 2019, the Financial Services Committee voted 45 to 15 to advance the bill to the full House.

The bill had "broad bipartisan support", and there were 152 cosponsors at the time of the committee vote – over a third of the entire House. Perlmutter, along with Washington Representative Denny Heck, "have introduced similar bills every Congress since 2013". On April 11, 2019, Oregon Senator Jeff Merkley introduced a companion bill in the U.S. Senate and the bill was referred to the Senate Banking, Housing, and Urban Affairs Committee. On June 6, 2019, the House bill moved out of committee and was placed on the Union Calendar for a vote.

, the House bill had 206 cosponsors (including U.S. House Judiciary Committee Chair Jerry Nadler and U.S. House Financial Services Committee Chair Maxine Waters), and the Senate bill had 33 cosponsors (including Senate Minority Whip Dick Durbin).

On September 20, 2019, House Majority Leader Steny Hoyer announced the bill was scheduled for a floor vote for the week of September 23 under suspension of the rules. Under suspension of House rules, the bill may not be amended, and must be approved by two thirds of the House of Representatives.

The bill was passed by the House on September 25, 2019.

The bill was originally drafted exclusively with banking institutions within its scope. However, the National Association of Professional Insurance Agents and other lobbying organizations achieved the addition of language from the "Clarifying Law Around Insurance of Marijuana" (CLAIM) Act, which existed in similar versions in both the House and the Senate. The added language rules out criminal and civil prosecution for both the entities and their employees or officers for the business of insuring cannabis-related industry when such industry is located in states which have legalized such activity.

The SAFE Banking Act provisions were included in the HEROES Act COVID-19 relief bill passed in the U.S. House in May 2020. They were again included in a bill approved by the house 214–207 in October. A push to include the SAFE Banking Act provisions in the end-of-year COVID-19 stimulus failed, though hope remained it could pass in 2021 if reintroduced.

The SAFE Banking Act was reintroduced in the 117th Congress in 2021 by a bipartisan group of over 100 members of the House. In late October 2022, Senate Majority Leader Chuck Schumer said a bill in his chamber was "very close". The Senate bill had additional provisions regarding expungements and was being called "SAFE Banking Plus". Industry publication Marijuana Business Daily asserted that SAFE Banking Plus was likely to be on the agenda in the lame-duck session following the November elections, as did Dow Jones' MarketWatch, while Kiplinger's Personal Finance said it had "some probability" of passage. In late November, Beacon Policy Advisors and Cowen Washington Research Group gave it a 70 and 75% chance of passage respectively.

In early December it was reported that Majority Leader Chuck Schumer, with bipartisan support, planned to attach the legislation to a "must pass" bill like the 2023 National Defense Authorization Act during the lame-duck session.

Provisions 
The following is the bill summary authorized by the Congressional Research Service (CRS) for the SAFE Banking Act, the version which passed the House:This bill generally prohibits a federal banking regulator from penalizing a depository institution for providing banking services to a legitimate cannabis-related business. Prohibited penalties include terminating or limiting the deposit insurance or share insurance of a depository institution solely because the institution provides financial services to a legitimate cannabis-related business and prohibiting or otherwise discouraging a depository institution from offering financial services to such a business.

Additionally, proceeds from a transaction involving activities of a legitimate cannabis-related business are not considered proceeds from unlawful activity. Proceeds from unlawful activity are subject to anti-money laundering laws.

Furthermore, a depository institution is not, under federal law, liable or subject to asset forfeiture for providing a loan or other financial services to a legitimate cannabis-related business.

The bill also provides that a federal banking agency may not request or order a depository institution to terminate a customer account unless (1) the agency has a valid reason for doing so, and (2) that reason is not based solely on reputation risk. Valid reasons for terminating an account include threats to national security and involvement in terrorist financing, including state sponsorship of terrorism.

Finally, the bill decreases the cap on the surplus funds of the Federal Reserve banks. (Amounts exceeding this cap are deposited in the general fund of the Treasury.)

Legislative history 
As of May 15, 2022:

Amendment to National Defense Authorization Act
The bill's language was added to the National Defense Authorization Act for Fiscal Year 2022 (NDAA) by amendment on September 21, 2021. A letter to Congress by a bipartisan group of just one fewer than half of U.S. state governors urged passage through the NDAA. The SAFE Banking provisions were removed from the NDAA prior to its being signed into law on December 27, 2021.

The bill was included in the National Defense Authorization Act for fiscal year 2023 passed by the House on July 14, 2022.

Amendment to America COMPETES Act
In January 2022, Perlmutter introduced an amendment to the America COMPETES Act of 2022 that incorporated the SAFE Banking Act. It was passed by the House on February 4. On April 20, 2022, Senator Patty Murray said that the banking amendment was likely to get passed in the America COMPETES Act "in a little over a month" through conference committee negotiations. Murray became the third-ranking member of the party in control of the U.S. Senate in 2016, and is a member of the conference committee.

Polling
A November 2022 poll of over 1,200 likely U.S. voters by Data for Progress showed strong support for many provisions of the bill. Making banking system accessible to the cannabis industry was supported by a 57-point margin.

See also
List of 2022 United States cannabis reform proposals

References

Further reading

External links
H.R.1595 - SAFE Banking Act of 2019 U.S. House of Representatives official website

Proposed legislation of the 116th United States Congress
Proposed legislation of the 117th United States Congress
Banking in the United States
Cannabis industry
2019 cannabis law reform
Cannabis in the United States
Insurance in the United States
2022 cannabis law reform
2021 cannabis law reform